Lost Hearts is a 1973 supernatural drama produced by the BBC as part of its A Ghost Story for Christmas series. Running at 35 minutes and directed by Lawrence Gordon Clark, it was written by Robin Chapman and was based on the 1895 short story "Lost Hearts" by M. R. James.

Synopsis

The drama tells the story of Stephen Elliott, a young orphan aged 11 years and of an inquiring and intellectual frame of mind, who is sent to stay with his much older cousin, the scholarly Mr Abney, at a remote country mansion, Aswarby Hall, in Lincolnshire. His cousin is a reclusive alchemist obsessed with making himself immortal. Abney’s library "contained all the then available books bearing on the Mysteries, the Orphic poems, the worship of Mithras, and the Neo–Platonists." Stephen is repeatedly troubled by visions of a young gypsy girl and a travelling Italian boy with their hearts missing.

Cast

Mr Abney .. Joseph O'Conor
Mrs Bunch .. Susan Richards
Stephen .. Simon Gipps-Kent
Parkes	.. James Mellor
Boy .. Christopher Davis
Girl .. Michelle Foster
Vicar .. Roger Milner

Adaptation
Lost Hearts was adapted by Robin Chapman in 1973 as part of the BBC's A Ghost Story for Christmas strand, directed by Lawrence Gordon Clark. The shortest of the adaptations, it was first broadcast on Christmas Day 1973 at 11:35 pm. It starred Simon Gipps-Kent as Stephen and Joseph O'Conor as Mr Abney. The adaptation is noted for the distinctive hurdy-gurdy music, L'amour De Moi, that accompanies appearances of the two ghostly children. Ralph Vaughan Williams's English Folk Song Suite is also featured.

Locations

Grade II* listed Ormsby Hall in South Ormsby in Lincolnshire stood in for the exterior shots of Aswarby Hall, while the churchyard of the nearby St Leonard's church in the village featured in the final scenes including the ghostly children waving to Stephen.

The Pelham Mausoleum near Brocklesby in Great Limber near Grimsby also featured in the production.

References

External links

Adaptations of works by M. R. James
BBC television dramas
Television shows based on short fiction
A Ghost Story for Christmas
1973 television films